Bailly may refer to:

People
 Alexis Bailly (1798–1860), American politician and fur trader
 Alice Bailly (1872–1938), Swiss painter
 Anatole Bailly (1833–1911), French Hellenist
 Auguste Bailly (1878–1967), French historian and novelist
 Benjamin Bailly (born 1990), Belgian racing driver
 Blanche Bailly (born 1995), Cameroonian singer
 Colette Bailly (born 1928), French pianist and composer
 David Bailly (1584–1657), Dutch Golden Age painter
 Dominique Bailly (born 1960), French politician
 Edmond Bailly (1850–1916), French librarian and publisher
 Edmond Bailly (footballer), Swiss footballer
 Eric Bailly (born 1994), Ivorian footballer
 Ernest Joseph Bailly (1753–1823), Flemish painter
 François Bailly (–1690), French mason and architect in Canada
 Gérard Bailly (born 1940), French politician
 Guillaume Bailly (died 1696), French Sulpician missionary to Canada
 Henri de Bailly (died 1637), French composer
 Henry G. Bailly (1828-1865), American politician and businessman
 Jacques Bailly (born 1966), Scripps National Spelling Bee's official pronouncer
 Jean-Baptiste Bailly (1822–1880), French ornithologist
 Jean-Christophe Bailly (born 1949), French writer
 Jean Sylvain Bailly (1736–1793), French astronomer and orator, one of the leaders of the early part of the French Revolution
 Joseph Bailly (1774–1835), French-Canadian fur trader and pioneer
 Joseph A. Bailly (1823 or 1825–1883), American sculptor
 Logan Bailly (born 1985), Belgian football goalkeeper
 Louis Bailly (1882–1974), French-Canadian violist
 Mary Cecilia Bailly (1815-1898), American nun and general superior of the Sisters of Providence of Saint Mary-of-the-Woods, Indiana
 Martine Bailly (born 1946), French cellist
 Pierre Bailly (1889–1973), French architect
 Rosa Bailly (1890–1976), French teacher, journalist and writer
 Sandrine Bailly (born 1979), French biathlete
 Séry Bailly (1948–2018), Ivorian academic, politician, and writer
 Simon Bailly, English politician
 Thomas Bailly, English politician

Places

Canada
 Bailly Lake (Saint-Cyr River South), Quebec

France
 Bailly, Oise
 Bailly, Yvelines
 Bailly-aux-Forges, Haute-Marne
 Bailly-en-Rivière, Seine-Maritime
 Bailly-le-Franc, Aube
 Bailly-Romainvilliers, Seine-et-Marne
 Baily, in the commune of Saint-Bris-le-Vineux, Yonne

Other uses
 Bailly (crater), a lunar crater
 Bailly Generating Station, in Indiana
 Bailiff

See also 
 Baily (disambiguation)
 Bailey (disambiguation)